Gianmarco Donaggio (born 4 August 1991) is an Italian avant-garde film director, cinematographer, artist and film theorist. He is considered an influential author for his innovative and critical approaches to the moving image. His works have been presented in major art museums, art biennials, and international film festivals.

Career 
Originally from Italy, Donaggio left the country after high school to study and work abroad. In his early twenties, he served as a camera and light technician on major international film productions, assisting academy-awarded cinematographers and directors. In the period of 2010–2020, he lived and worked between the UK and Norway. He debuted as a film director at the historical Pesaro Film Festival, the same year he got a prize at Asolo Film Festival and won the contemporary art fair in Milan.

Advocating for a different cinema he started creating his own audio-visual experiments as he graduated in image philosophy at the University of Lund. Understanding filmmaking as a practice based on motion rather than information, he pontificates for a cinema intended as a dance performance or a choreography of light. Therefore, his works are primarily not-narrative and necessarily evolve from the image and its prime motion.

Works 

 Azul no Azul (2022)
 Manifestarsi (2021)
 Milano di Carta (2020)

Writing 

 2021. Donaggio, Gianmarco "Cinematic Duration as Violence across Cinematography History and Samples" Cinematography in Progress.
 2022. Donaggio, Gianmarco. "The dancing qualities of the cinematic space" Lund University. Dep. of Arts and Cultural Science.

References 

1991 births
Living people